Discrimination against drug addicts is a form of discrimination against people who suffer from a drug addiction.

In the process of stigmatization, drug addicts are stereotyped as having a particular set of undesirable traits, in turn causing other individuals to act in a fearful or prejudicial manner toward them.

Background 

Drug use discrimination is the unequal treatment people experience because of the drugs they use. People who use or have used illicit drugs may face discrimination in employment, welfare, housing, child custody, and travel, in addition to imprisonment, asset forfeiture, and in some cases forced labor, torture, and execution. Though often prejudicially stereotyped as deviants and misfits, most drug users are well-adjusted and productive members of society. Drug prohibitions may have been partly motivated by racism and other prejudice against minorities, and racial disparities have been found to exist in the enforcement and prosecution of drug laws. Discrimination due to illicit drug use was the most commonly reported type of discrimination among Blacks and Latinos in a 2003 study of minority drug users in New York City, double to triple that due to race. People who use legal drugs such as tobacco and prescription medications may also face discrimination.

Individual factors 
Drugs (especially opioids and stimulants) can change the motivational patterns of a person and lead to desocialization and degradation of personality. Acquisition of the drugs sometimes involves black market activities, exposing users to social circles engaging in other criminal behavior. Certain types of criminal behavior can also put drug users at further risk of harm, or lead to additional stigmatization (sex work, drug dealing, theft, robbery, etc.).

Institutional basis 

Stigma by health care professionals stems from a belief that people with substance use disorder are not interested in their health as much as they are seeking drugs. This results in people with substance use disorders receiving unfair medical care. As well as hiding their underlying medical concerns and not receiving the medical and recovery care that is needed. Healthcare providers have effective tools such as medications for opioid and alcohol addiction that can help prevent many overdoses. These tools are not used widely in the United States healthcare system. The stigma that surrounds drug addicts is the main cause of why the healthcare system does not use these tools and medications. In the United States healthcare system there has not been much done to remove this stigmatism. Many healthcare providers do not view addiction as a disease and a mental illness.

The drugs Ritalin (methylphenidate) and Adderall (amphetamine) are stimulants often prescribed for ADHD. In colleges there has been an influx of this type of drug trafficked. These drugs stimulate the nervous system, causing wakefulness and attentiveness. Prescribing opioids to patients and related overdose has become a serious problem in the US.

Lack of objective information about drugs 
An important role in the process of discrimination is played by the lack of objective information about drug addiction and drug addicts, caused by legislative barriers to scientific research and the displacement of such information by propaganda of various kinds.

Drug addiction has been categorized as a subcategory of mental illness. They are referred to as co-occurring disorders, which means that if a person is dealing with an addiction, they may also struggle with a mental illness. Most individuals who suffer from drug dependency are nearly twice as likely to suffer from a mental illness as well. According to the Substance Abuse and Mental Health Services Administration, about 8.9 million adults who have an addiction also have a psychiatric disorder. When dealing with either a mental illness or a drug addiction some symptoms people will experience are being incapable of controlling their own impulses and mood swings.

When a person falls victim to drug addiction, they will undergo the five stages of addiction which are the first use, the continued use, tolerance, dependence, and addiction. The first use stage, is the stage where individuals experiment with drugs and alcohol. This is the stage where individuals may partake in drug use due to curiosity, peer pressure, emotional problems among other reasons. In the continued use stage, individuals know how the drug makes them feel and are likely to notice that they are not getting high as quickly as they use too. In the tolerance stage, the brain and the body have adjusted to the drug and it takes longer to get the effect an individual is seeking. Tolerance arrives after a period of continued use and is one of the first warning signs of addiction. In the dependence stage, the brain becomes accustomed to the drug and does not function well without it. Substance abusers become physically ill without the use of drugs and will begin to develop symptoms of withdrawal.  In the addiction stage, individuals may struggle to discontinue use of drugs even if they do not enjoy it or if their behavior has caused problems within their lives.

With the increasing number of adults that suffer from an addiction, only a few will receive treatment due to the complexity of health care systems. Most health care systems do not have insurance coverage for addiction recovery and many health care providers have little to no training in treating addiction. Some doctors do not feel comfortable treating addictions, due to their lack of knowledge and training of the topic. The American Society of Addiction Medicine reports that there are only 3,000 board-certified addiction specialist physicians in the United States while there are nearly 2 million people experiencing opioid addiction. The limited presence and access to comprehensive care for addiction poses a barrier for recovery for many, particularly those hailing from lower socioeconomic backgrounds.

Role of language 
Stigma founded in societal preconceptions about substance dependence often perpetuates discrimination against those with Substance use disorder (SUD). How language regarding SUD is framed plays an important role in mediating stigma experienced by those with the condition, which can consequently shape critical outcomes for this population such as treatment contact, social isolation, and attitudes towards healthcare providers. Shifting towards person-first language has been emphasized in healthcare provider circles to mitigate such stigma. For instance, as opposed to saying "former addict" or "reformed addict", the National Institute on Drug Abuse (NIDA) recommends language such as "person in recovery" or "person who previously used drugs" to separate the problem from the individual. The NIDA additionally applies a similar framework to terminology such as "clean" or "dirty" to denote whether or not someone is actively using as they cite the former vocabulary holds punitive connotations. Moreover, SUD policy reform advocates report language adjacent to SUD can misconstrue associated medical treatment practices which in turn poses barriers to expanded harm reduction efforts from being adopted. An example of this provided in a 2017 executive memorandum from The National Prevention Council was a recommendation to wean usage of "opioid substitution replacement therapy" which many believe falsely alludes that an individual is substituting their addiction for another (i.e. from heroin to methadone) to "opioid agonist therapy".

Drugs and HIV infection 
Among injecting drug users, the incidence of HIV infection is higher than among other drug addicts, however punitive and discriminatory measures against drug addicts are not able to eliminate either the spread of drug addiction or HIV. Researchers say that around 90% of people that choose to inject drugs have missed prior opportunities for HIV testing that were provided.

Regional patterns

Africa 
Africa has an estimated number 28 million substance users. This number is impacted by the rising availability of injection-based drugs such as heroin, cocaine, and methamphetamines. Socio-demographic factors are often primary determinants of the health status of drug users. These factors contribute to individual drug use behaviors such as the sharing of needles and the solicitation of sex in exchange for police protection or more drugs. Nutritional status, family support, stigma/discrimination, adherence to medication, and recovery from addiction are also impacted by these socio-demographic factors. Research shows that the majority of drug users transition from the use of non-injection substances to injection substances or use both simultaneously.

Kenya 
In Kenya there is a link between injection-related discrimination, mental health, physical health, and the quality of life for those who inject drugs. The rates of discrimination are linked to higher levels of psychological distress and risk behaviors. Women in Kenya account for 10% of drug users. These women tend to experience the regular discrimination faced by drug users in addition to gender related discrimination. Levels of discrimination are often higher for those that are also HIV positive.

Tanzania 
The Tanzanian government initiated support for substance-dependence treatment rehabilitation in the latter 20th century, with the Ministry of Health administering the Treatnet II center network to oversee this care. Treatment centers and harm reduction efforts in Tanzania have come into conflict with recent discourse from politicians, such as President John Magufuli, who established the nation's war on drugs in early 2017. Calling for the arrest of anyone involved in narcotics, Magufuli's stance is distinct from growing harm reduction pathways established in sub-Saharan Africa in the early decades of 2000. This wave of criminalization policy aims to redress the issue of those who use being primarily being targeted by law enforcement, rather than other individuals involved in the trafficking schema. Tanzania's policing of injection drug use has encouraged both consumers and traffickers to further ingratiate themselves in the nation's black market, with injection drug users consequently being more likely to be involved in sex work and other illicit trafficking, rather than engage in traditional employment opportunities which risk greater exposure. Populations that exist at this intersection, for instance, Tanzanian women sex workers who engage in injection drug use, are alienated from utilizing risk reduction interventions due to fear of arrest.

Low-income, urban, young men which are the most likely populace to be recruited to illicit substance trafficking due to lack of economic opportunity otherwise, have been highly scrutinized under recent waves of drug criminalization. Substance use ranging from marijuana to heroin is prohibited and a record denoting arrest for such use highly influences subsequent employment outcomes after time served for these individuals, which can ultimately be deleterious to expanding economic mobility within the communities they hail from.

A study published in the Review of African Political Economy notes that commerce and political corruption in Tanzania have promulgated crack cocaine consumption and flash-blood practices, or blood sharing between substance users after recent injections, specifically among poor youth in urban centers.

Asia

India 
Narcotic substance consumption is prohibited in India by the Narcotic Drugs and Psychotropic Substances Bill inducted in 1985, which also levies punitive measures on adjacent activities such as production or vending of such substances. Possession of a controlled substance can result in punishment ranging from a $136.21 USD fine and half a year imprisonment to $121,261 USD and twenty years imprisonment, depending on whether the amount identified is considered small or commercial. Certain crimes outlined by the Narcotic Drugs and Psychotropic Substances Bill are also eligible for the death penalty, and while cases involving marijuana have been charged with capital punishment in the past, they tend to be successfully appealed in higher courts. This legislation is heavily influenced by a coordinated United Nations effort throughout the latter twentieth century to stymie international drug trafficking.

According to the International Drug Policy Consortium, India's Narcotics Control Bureau, which executes the various facets of the Narcotic Drugs and Psychotropic Substances Bill, has encountered criticism for the legislation's stringent measures which have limited access to pain-relief medication, specifically the prescription of opiates for post-operative patients. Bill revisions in response have expanded access to such substances, like methadone, to be distributed through recognized care providers, and members of parliaments have subsequently pushed for expanded bill protections for marijuana use, which has not gained traction. Language cited as demeaning within the 2012 National Policy on Drugs and Psychotropic Substances regarding harm reduction pipelines such as clean needle programs, referring to such as "shooting galleries," have posed barriers to preventing comorbidities such as HIV which are prevalent among injection substance users in India. This poses an issue in states such as Punjab where over 20% of injection substance users are also infected with HIV.

Philippines 

In the Philippines, the government's war on drugs has led to allegations of killings and other human rights violations by the Philippine National Police against drug suspects.

This has led the United Nations Human Rights Council to adopt a resolution urging the Philippine government to set up an investigation into mass killings during the war on drugs.

Vietnam 
Drug control strategy in modern Vietnam was first formally introduced in 1990 around the cause of eradicating "social evils," in reference to substance use. Such policies were inspired by the UN, and specifically, its International Drug Conventions which took placed from the latter 1960s to 1997. Ordinances and violation measures were propositioned by the Vietnamese National Assembly in this legislation to mandate compulsory treatment for substance users, rather than subject them to prison. High input in mandatory treatment centers has resulted in a tendency for there to be more patients at treatment centers than can be handled, thus limiting access to rehabilitation for these individuals. Harm reduction measures such as clean needles and condom access have been introduced throughout the 2000s at a national level to address the prevalence of HIV and HCV among drug users. Inconsistencies between the Ordinance on HIVAIDS which outlines such harm reduction practices, and the Drug Law of 2000, which prohibits the distribution of materials like needles, has made provincial adoption of harm reduction institutions, like syringe exchanges, challenging.

While Vietnamese policy leaders generally veer towards addressing substance use as a medical issue, rather than criminal activity, having decriminalized many substances since 2009, the Ordinance of Administrative Violation continues to classify illicit substance consumption as a crime. Consequently, at a local level, substance users remain eligible to be charged by law enforcement and subjected to forced labor treatment centers that are comparable to detention. Thus, many substance users do not access harm reduction institutions out of fear of being identified by law enforcement and placed in these conditions.

Europe

Sweden 
Narcotic substance use is criminalized in Sweden, with drug offenses holding punishments ranging from fines to six months imprisonment. To apprehend substance users, law enforcement is permitted to conduct urine testing on the basis of suspicion, rather than wholly requiring a public disturbance. Such protocol is justified by lawmakers as a way to expand early intervention for substance users to rehabilitation channels, but legal advocates have challenged such practices for infringing upon personal freedoms. Diversion to court-ordered treatment programs rather than criminalization has been expanded in response during the early 21st century, however, there are disparities in representation in such programs. For example, substance users found in violation who belong to the top third Swedish wealth bracket are twice as likely to be admitted into a treatment program rather than imprisoned than compared to an individual who committed a similar offense but belongs to the bottom two-thirds of the wealth bracket. Moreover, while those with substance dependence can apply to their local welfare administrator for rehabilitative services, this process is selective despite being less costly than long-term imprisonment for an associated drug-related crime.

Sweden has faced criticism for having harsher drug policies and less accessible rehabilitative programs for substance users than peer Nordic nations which are moving towards drug liberalization. Many cite this for why Sweden has rising substance-related mortality in the 21st century, for instance, having 157 overdose deaths in 2006 compared to the Netherlands which had a little over a hundred despite having a population close to double the size. Zero-tolerance policies are also in place for those who drive under the influence of an illicit substance.

North America

Canada 

In Vancouver, Canada, there have been efforts to reduce opioid-related deaths. An article published by the Canadian Medical Association Journal discusses new efforts to create safe injection sites for people struggling with opioid addiction. Vancouver politicians created these sites for people to safely use drugs that they are addicted to without the risk of infection or prosecution by the police. These safe injection sites provide sterilized needles to limit the reuse of needles that lead to the spread of AIDS and other diseases. Drug addicts in Vancouver have been discriminated against on numerous occasions. Mothers who are said to be drug addicts have had their children taken away, as they are thought to be unfit mothers. These women have a hard time getting jobs because employers might not want to hire someone who they believe are drug addicts. Women have started a union for drug users in Vancouver to aid them with housing and education to help them get back on their feet.

United States 

The War on Drugs, which formalized in the 1970s with the Nixon administration, has disparately affected communities of color in the United States. Substantial punitive measures exist for illicit possession, whether that be in the context of use, trafficking, or selling, with length of incarceration scaling up with repeat offenses. Charges can go up to life without parole for third-time offenses related to opiates such as fentanyl. Three-quarters of those imprisoned for fentanyl today are people of color, which directly corresponds to Black and Latin populations being disproportionately policed for drug-related crimes. This additionally infringes upon voting eligibility among substance-using populations, as more extreme drug charges hold felony status which revokes voting rights in a majority of states. Drug criminalization moreover operates within the deportation pipeline in the US, with drug charges making all individuals without citizenship eligible for deportation. This includes marijuana-related charges which have constituted over ten thousand deportations from 2012 to 2013, often severing families and communities. While statewide measures to legalize marijuana have gained traction throughout 2010, individuals of color have been less likely to receive post-carceral clemency for these charges due to barriers to legal advocacy.

Substance dependence disorder advocates have criticized the use of demeaning language regarding the condition in criminal litigation to leverage character assault against defendants or victims who have or presumed to have the condition. A prominent example of this is the trial of Derek Chauvin, the former Minneapolis police officer convicted of murdering George Floyd, whose legal defense asserted substance use as a potential cause of death, rather than the asphyxiation incurred from Chauvin.

Discrimination against people who use an illegal substance is very common in the workplace, a familiar example happens when employers give random drug test to see if the employee will pass it. However, according to the Rehabilitation Act of 1973, employers are supposed to ensure that alcoholics and other drug addicts get help and the accommodations that they need. The Disability Discrimination Act of 1995 may not cover employees who are using drugs. According to Davies Robert, "an employee who claims that addiction is a disability is mistaken, as alcoholism and drug addictions are specifically excluded from the Disability Discrimination Act 1995 (DDA). But severe depression caused by or related to a person's alcoholism or gambling addiction, for example, can be covered by the DDA if the effect on day-to-day activities lasts for 12 months or longer. Claims alleging discrimination then become possible". The most common discrimination in the workplace is that during the interview process some employers overlook the interviewer's qualifications because they know they have or had a problem with drugs, and make a decision solely based on their addiction when the interviewer could be well qualified for the position. This is against the Discrimination  Act 1995  (DDA). This act has counted addiction and alcoholism as a disability, so therefore addiction is protected under this act. Through the years, this act has declined in defending these individuals. According to "Alcoholism & Drug Abuse Weekly", Miranda John states, "the strength of these protections has been eroded in recent years as a result of court decisions and the lack of a strong constituency advocating the rights of addicts and alcoholics." (John, De Miranda, "Discrimination Against Drug Addicts and Alcohol Still Persists." (Alcoholism and Drug Abuse Weekly, Vol 13. Issue 47 P.5, 2001, December 12) The lack of job opportunities and treatment for drug addicts often results in relapses or in jail. Nathan Kim and his associates once conducted a study on the HIV status of people who inject drugs and found that the HIV rate in those individuals in San Francisco increased by 16.1% from the year 2009 when the HIV rate was 64.4%, to 80.5% in 2015.

See also 
 Cognitive liberty
 Drug liberalization
 Legalisation of marijuana

References 

Discrimination by type
Drug culture
Addiction